John Ebong Ngole (11 January 1940 – 2 July 2020) was a Cameroonian prefect, governor, and minister.

References

Cameroonian politicians
Cameroonian people
1940 births
2020 deaths